Össjö (formerly Åsbo-Össjö) is a small town in the Ängelholm Municipality of Skåne County in Sweden.   it has a recorded population of 192 and an area of 26 hectares.  It lies at 56° 14´ north, 13° 2´ east.

The town is the birthplace of musician Marie Fredriksson of the band Roxette.

Össjö Gård, an estate, is located in Össjö. It was built in the years 1814-1815 by Adolf Fredrik Tornérhjelm.

Other notable buildings include the railway station (built in 1904 by the Ängelholm Klippan railway, closed in 1953), and a church which lies at the center of the town.

References 

Populated places in Skåne County